is a Japanese footballer who plays as a midfielder and currently play for YSCC Yokohama.

Career
On 28 February 2023, Matsumura announcement officially transfer to J3 club, YSCC Yokohama for ahead of 2023 season.

Career statistics

Club
.

Notes

References

External links

1996 births
Living people
Osaka Kyoiku University alumni
Japanese footballers
Association football midfielders
J3 League players
Fujieda MYFC players
YSCC Yokohama players